Paris Hamilton (born July 26, 1981) is an American football player, a wide receiver, who attended the University of Minnesota.

College career
Paris Hamilton joined the Minnesota Golden Gophers in 2003 but blew out his left knee in summer conditioning and missed the season. He had four catches for 198 yards and two touchdowns in 2004 . Hamilton played for Tyler (TX) Junior College prior to signing with Minnesota.

Professional career
Hamilton was signed to the Detroit Lions during the 2005 season. He also played with them during the 2006 season.  On June 13, 2007 Hamilton signed with the Minnesota Vikings but was placed on injury reserve after suffering a torn ACL. .

1981 births
American football wide receivers
Detroit Lions players
Minnesota Golden Gophers football players
Minnesota Vikings players
Tyler Apaches football players
Living people